Dildo Island is an island in the Canadian province of Newfoundland and Labrador. It is the largest of three islands located at the entrance to Dildo Tip in the bottom of Trinity Bay, off the coast of the neighbouring town of Dildo. As of 2016, Dildo was home to approximately 1,200 people.

An archaeological excavation in 1995 discovered Dorset artifacts dated to between 150 CE and 750 CE. It is believed that these people camped on Dildo Island for the purpose of seal hunting. In 2001, excavations were begun on a recently discovered Native American site that radiocarbon dated to between CE 720 and 960 CE. Evidence of a camp was found with the remnants of a wigwam and hearth. John Guy's journal of 1612 suggested evidence of a Beothuk Indian camp on Dildo Island. An English fort was established in the early 18th century to defend the south side of Trinity Bay from the French during Queen Anne's War.

A cod hatchery operated on Dildo Island from 1889 to 1897, created by Adolf Neilsen and funded by the Newfoundland government. At the time, the province of Newfoundland was one of the world leaders in hatchery technology and production. At its peak, the hatchery produced approximately 200 million cod per year.

References

Islands of Newfoundland and Labrador